Built in 1928, Scott Reservoir is an irrigation impoundment on Porter Creek near Pinetop-Lakeside, Arizona, USA. The least developed of the "in town" lakes, trees surround Scott Reservoir. It lies just outside the town limits on the Apache-Sitgreaves National Forests.

Description
It is usually somewhat turbid, which helps control algae blooms and aquatic weeds. This, coupled with a perennial stream flowing in, creates a stable water quality condition. The lake is stocked with catchable-sized rainbow trout in spring, early summer and fall, and it is occasionally stocked with channel catfish. There are also some largemouth bass.

Fish species
 Rainbow
 Largemouth Bass
 Sunfish
 Catfish (Channel)

References

External links
Arizona Boating Locations Facilities map
Arizona Fishing Locations map

Apache-Sitgreaves National Forests
Reservoirs in Arizona
Reservoirs in Navajo County, Arizona